Lupus ruled the Duchy of Spoleto from 745 to 751. He was relatively independent of royal authority.

He made many donations to the Abbey of Farfa and had a close relationship with Abbot Fulcoald. On his death, the duchy was probably seized by Aistulf and then granted to one Unnolf for a brief spell.

References

Sources
Hodgkin, Thomas. Italy and her Invaders. Clarendon Press: 1895.

751 deaths
8th-century dukes of Spoleto
Year of birth unknown